The Halfway River is a tributary of the Avon River in  Nova Scotia, Canada.

There are two impoundments located within the Halfway River system, used by Minas Basin Pulp and Power Limited for water storage.

References

Rivers of Nova Scotia
Landforms of Kings County, Nova Scotia